Magdeburg–Cochstedt Airport  is a minor unscheduled airport located in Cochstedt, Germany. As of 1 September 2016, the airport had been closed by the authorities and sold as a testing facility to the German Aerospace Center in 2019.

History
The airport Cochstedt dates from the year 1957, when an air force base of the Soviet troops was established. In 1968, the runway extension was completed and airport logistics operation expanded. After German reunification and the withdrawal of Soviet troops, the first steps for continued existence as a civil airport were taken.

On 26 May 1994 the airport was given an operating license as a commercial airport with class D airspace and full day and night operation. From November 1997 until early 1999 the operations were suspended due to a complete refurbishment of the airport, including runway, apron, taxiways, control tower.

In June 2000, an instrument landing system (ILS) Category I and a high-performance approach lights were put into operation allowing the operation under instrument flying rules. In the summer of 2001 a new fire station was put into operation and the construction of a new terminal building for the General Aviation ("GAT") started. However, before works were completed, on 31 December 2001 operation was suspended due to insolvency of the airport operator.

On behalf of the state of Saxony-Anhalt GSA acquired all assets from the bankrupt estate. The new operating company FMC mbH was founded in 2005 jointly with the Landkreis Aschersleben-Staßfurt. On 4 March 2010 the airport was acquired by the Danish company Development A/S.

On 31 August 2016, the state authorities revoked the airport's operational license for instrumental approaches and therefore de facto closing it until further notice from 1 September 2016. It was stated that the airport failed to provide required documentation needed to keep the license.

In 2019, the German Aerospace Center purchased the entire airport to establish a testing facility for drones and helicopters.

Airlines and destinations

Ryanair operated summer seasonal flights out of Magdeburg–Cochstedt from 2011 to 2013, the last remaining destinations served being Girona and Palma de Mallorca. In December 2013 Ryanair announced the cancellation of these routes, leaving the airport without any scheduled flights. The airport was however used for few occasional leisure charter services once or twice per month after that.

Ground transportation
The airport can be reached via federal highway B180. Magdeburg can be reached within 40 minutes. There are currently no public scheduled transportation services.

See also
 Transport in Germany
 List of airports in Germany

References

External links

 Official website
 
 

Airports in Saxony-Anhalt
1957 establishments in East Germany
Military facilities of the Soviet Union in Germany
Airports established in 1957